Analipsi may refer to the following places in Greece:

 Analipsi, Thessaloniki, a village in Langadas municipality
 Analipsi, a village on the island of Astypalaia, Dodecanese
 Analipsi, a village in Kastro-Kyllini, western Peloponnese
 Analipsi, a village in Messenia, southwest Peloponnese
 Analipsi, a village near Hersonissos, Crete
 Analipsi, a community in Thermo, Aetolia-Acarnania
 Analipsi Chryssovitsas, a village near Metsovo, Epirus